John Kuan (born 9 June 1940), also known as Kuan Chung, is a Taiwanese politician who was president of the Examination Yuan of the Republic of China from 2008 to 2014.

Personal life
Kuan is of Manchu descent, belonging to the Plain White Banner. His surname Kuan is the sinicized form of his clan (hala) name Gūwalgiya.

Kuan's daughter, Wendy Kuan (關雲娣), died in May 2011 after she fell from the kitchen window of her 27th floor apartment in Shanghai. It was rumored that she committed suicide because her husband, Zero Lin (林哲樂), was having an affair. Kuan has avoided meeting Lin ever since his daughter's death, refusing to attend any family events where his son-in-law would be present.

See also
Manchu people in Taiwan

References

Living people
1940 births
Tufts University alumni
University of Indianapolis alumni
Kuomintang Members of the Legislative Yuan in Taiwan
Taiwanese people of Manchu descent
Republic of China politicians from Tianjin
Taiwanese Presidents of the Examination Yuan
Taiwanese Ministers of Civil Service
Manchu politicians
Members of the 2nd Legislative Yuan
National Chengchi University alumni
Taiwanese people from Tianjin
Taipei Members of the Legislative Yuan
National Taiwan University alumni
21st-century Taiwanese politicians